The 23 municipalities of the Central Finland Region in Finland are divided on six sub-regions.



Äänekoski sub-region 
 Äänekoski
 Konnevesi

Jämsä sub-region 
 Jämsä

Joutsa sub-region 
 Joutsa
 Luhanka

Jyväskylä sub-region 
 Hankasalmi
 Jyväskylä
 Laukaa (Laukas)
 Muurame
 Petäjävesi
 Toivakka
 Uurainen

Keuruu sub-region 
 Keuruu (Keuru)
 Multia

Saarijärvi-Viitasaari sub-region 
 Kannonkoski
 Karstula
 Kivijärvi
 Kyyjärvi
 Saarijärvi
 Kinnula
 Pihtipudas
 Viitasaari

Former municipalities 
 Äänekosken maalaiskunta (to Äänekoski in 1969)
 Koskenpää (to Jämsänkoski in 1969)
 Pihlajavesi (to Keuruu in 1969)
 Konginkangas (to Äänekoski in 1993)
 Säynätsalo (to Jyväskylä in 1993)
 Sumiainen (to Äänekoski in 2007)
 Suolahti (to Äänekoski in 2007)
 Leivonmäki (to Joutsa in 2008)
 Jämsänkoski (to Jämsä in 2009)
 Jyväskylän maalaiskunta (to Jyväskylä in 2009)
 Korpilahti (to Jyväskylä in 2009)
 Pylkönmäki (to Saarijärvi in 2009)

 Kuhmoinen was moved to the Pirkanmaa region in 2021.

The following municipalities were not in Central Finland, but were merged into Central Finnish municipalities:
 Kuorevesi (to Jämsä in 2001)
 Längelmäki (partially to Jämsä in 2007)

See also 
Western Finland
Regions of Western Finland

External links